Steven Joel Kerzner is a Canadian actor, producer and television personality best known for his portrayal of Ed the Sock, originally appearing on CityTV and MuchMusic (until its decline in 2013). Kernzer has continued to portray the character through his own media initiatives FU Network and NewMusicNation.

Career 

As a teenager in 1984 Kerzner began volunteering through a student co-op program at Newton Cable, a small local station in Downsview, Ontario. It was at the station that Kernzer developed the Ed the Sock character. Requiring a co-host on short notice, so Kerzner took a sock and other supplies from the station's craft closet and made a sock puppet with glue caps for eyes. He named the puppet Ed after Ed Asner and co-hosted the segment himself.  By 1987 Kerzner became a producer and director of programming.

Kerzner later moved the character to CityTV and MuchMusic.

Following the decline of MuchMusic in 2013, due to an acquisition by Bell Media, Kerzner has made a number of attempts to bring the character back through the use of online media. In 2016, he announced the FU Network and in 2021 created the NewMusicNation brand, raising funds for creating an online version of what MuchMusic used to be like.

Filmography

TV

Film 

Kerzner appeared as Ed the Sock in the 2018 film The Joke Thief.

Politics 
Kerzner ran in the 1990 Ontario general election in the riding of Wilson Heights for Mike Harris' Progressive Conservative Party of Ontario, but finished third to the Liberal and NDP candidates.

Results of 1990 Ontario provincial election for the riding of Wilson Heights:

A fiscal and foreign-policy conservative, Kerzner's political heroes were Margaret Thatcher, Ronald Reagan, Harris and Brian Mulroney. Since the mid-2000s he has offered more left-of center views, stating in a 2009 interview that he is "no longer a conservative". In recent years, he has vigorously defended Liberal Justin Trudeau, particularly in the wake of the SNC-Lavalin scandal.

In a 2012 interview in which he spoke in favor of the legalization of marijuana, Kerzner stated that the war on drugs was an impossible mistake and said vices such as liquor, gambling and smoking are only taxed because "they make us feel good".

Personal life 
Kerzner married Liana Kerzner in 1999.

References 

1970 births
Living people
Much (TV channel) personalities
People from Toronto
Television show creators
Progressive Conservative Party of Ontario candidates in Ontario provincial elections